Conrad Helmut Fritz Böcker (24 August 1870 in Leipzig – 8 April 1936 in Frankfurt) was a German gymnast.  He competed at the 1896 Summer Olympics in Athens. Böcker had little success in individual events.  He competed in the parallel bars, horizontal bar, vault, pommel horse, and rings events.  In none of them was he among the medallists. He did, however, win two gold medals as part of the German team in the two team events, on parallel bars and the horizontal bar.

References

External links
*

1870 births
1936 deaths
German male artistic gymnasts
Gymnasts at the 1896 Summer Olympics
19th-century sportsmen
Olympic gymnasts of Germany
Olympic gold medalists for Germany
Olympic medalists in gymnastics
Medalists at the 1896 Summer Olympics
Athletes from Leipzig